The following is a list of all films shown at the 27th Sundance Film Festival.

Feature competition

The following films were shown in competition at the 27th Sundance Film Festival.

U.S. Documentary

The following 16 films were selected from 841 submissions and each is a world premiere.

U.S. Dramatic

The following 16 films were selected from 1,102 submissions and each is a world premiere.

World Cinema Documentary

The following 12 films were selected from 796 submissions.

World Cinema Dramatic

The following 14 films were selected from 1,073 submissions.

Non-competition features

Premieres

Documentary premieres

Spotlight

NEXT

Park City at Midnight

From the Collection

New Frontier Films

Native Showcase

Shorts

References

External links
 Sundance Film Festival Screening List at the Internet Movie Database

Sundance 2011
2011 films
Sundance films